Here I Come may refer to:

 "Here I Come" (The Roots song), 2006
 "Here I Come" (Fergie song), 2008
 Here I Come (album), a 1985 album by Barrington Levy, and the title song
 Here I Come, the British title for Harvard, Here I Come!, a 1941 American film directed by Lew Landers